The Greater Natal (lit. Grande Natal, officially Natal Metropolitan Region, lit. Região Metropolitana de Natal) is a metropolitan area located in Rio Grande do Norte state in Brazil. It consists of nine municipalities, including the capital, Natal.

The metropolitan area of Natal is known as a historical, cultural and economic center of state, with a total population of 1,263 million inhabitants. The region was first officially defined on January 16, 1997. Only a few municipalities show a high level of agglomeration — namely,  Natal-Parnamirim and Natal-São Gonçalo do Amarante.

The state government's greatest challenge is connecting all the cities in the metropolitan area by bus. There is a plan called "Via Metropolitana" (Metropolitan Highway) to connect all cities.

Municipalities in Greater Natal

References

Populated places in Rio Grande do Norte
Metropolitan areas of Brazil
Geography of Rio Grande do Norte